San Fernando, officially the Municipality of San Fernando, is a 2nd class municipality in the province of Camarines Sur, Philippines. According to the 2020 census, it has a population of 38,626 people.

History
Ambos Camarines included among its "visitas" or barrios the town of San Fernando. The town, however, also remained as a "barrio" of Milaor for more than 230 years.

Pueblo de San Fernando separated from Milaor and was established as an independent pueblo on 1 January 1813.

The residents of this old settlement were noted for their religious devotion as manifested by their honor and dedication to San Fernando, the town's patron saint. This patron of San Fernando, according to historical records, was however not the original patron saint for whom the first settlers built the chapel. They actually built a chapel in honor of their patron saint San Fernando. However, for some unusual reasons, the image was lost after it had been transferred into the newly erected chapel. It was said that efforts were wielded to find the missing icon but it all ended into great frustration as the lost image of San Fernando was not found. One resident from the old site where the image was housed later informed the people of San Fernando that the image returned to its original location. With this incident, the Teniente del Barrio then decided to install the image of another saint, Saint John the Baptist. Their celebration of the town and parish fiesta is held every 24 June.

Geography

Barangays
San Fernando is administratively subdivided into 22 barangays.

Climate

Demographics

Religion

The present parish priest is Rev. Fr. Michael Dela Rosa V.G.. At present the parish is taking care of 22 barangays of the municipality with the vision of forming SKK, saradit na kristiyanong komunidad (basic ecclesial communities). There are 235 clusters of families. Each cluster is composed of 15-20 neighboring families. Each cluster has a shepherd, called a cluster leader. A leader serves as the co-ordinator for all pastoral and community activities.

Economy 

Industries include hat making and bag making.

The main agricultural product is rice. Backyard poultry and piggery are also practiced.

Fishery and aquatic resources include hito, dalag, martinico, carp, tilapia, eels and mirapina which thrive in fresh water.

Economic growth

Being a town with access to water, has wide agriculture land, and is strategically located along the national highway, the town rapidly become an area of development.

The government also made road improvements all over the rural and urban areas. Areas such as Planza, Pamukid, and Grijalvo have become major hubs that all combined has 21% of the GDP of the entire municipality.

Education

Elementary schools 
San Fernando Central School
Bical Elementary School
Calscagas Elementary School
 Pamukid Elementary School
FERAN Learning Center
 Sta. Cruz Elementary School
 Planza Elementary School
 Alianza Elementary School
 Grijalvo Elementary School
 Beberon Elementary School
 Lupi Elementary School
 Pipian Elementary School
 Daculang Tubig Elementary School
 Bocal Elementary School
 Marangi Elementary School
 Calascagas Elementary School
Gnaran Elementary School
 Pinamasagan Elementary School

Secondary schools 
San Fernando National High School founded in 1966, located at Barangay Buenavista.
Pamukid National High School
Lupi National High School
Pinamasagan National High School
Marangi High School
Bical Elementary School

Healthcare
 DOH Camarines Sur
 San Fernando hospital 
 Pamukid barangay center

References

External links

San Fernando Website
 [ Philippine Standard Geographic Code]
Philippine Census Information
Official web site of the Province of Camarines Sur

Municipalities of Camarines Sur
Metro Naga
Populated places established in 1813
1813 establishments in the Philippines